The German Peace Society ( (DFG)) was founded in 1892 in Berlin. In 1900 it moved its headquarters to Stuttgart.  It still exists and is known as the Deutsche Friedensgesellschaft - Vereinigte KriegsdienstgegnerInnen (DFG-VK; German Peace Society - United War Resisters).

Persons associated with it historically include Nobel Peace Prize winners Alfred Hermann Fried and Bertha von Suttner, as well as Ludwig Quidde, Richard Grelling and Carl von Ossietzky. Suppressed by the Nazis, it was refounded in November 1945.

See also
Das Andere Deutschland, a publication of the German Peace Society.
 List of anti-war organizations

References

Karl Holl. Pazifismus in Deutschland. Suhrkamp, Frankfurt am Main. 1988.

Further reading

External links

 Europeana. Items related to Deutsche Friedensgesellschaft, various dates
 

Peace organisations based in Germany
Organisations based in Stuttgart